Skaggs Island Naval Communication Station  is a former United States Navy installation  located near California State Route 37 between Novato and Vallejo, California.  It was a secretive, secure, and self-contained naval base, engaged in a number of communications and intelligence gathering functions for the Navy and other federal intelligence organizations. The  site was purchased by the Navy in 1941, and closed in 1993. The antennas continued to be used for some time after that, but by 2013 they were removed along with all of the remaining buildings.

Skaggs Island

Skaggs Island was once a thriving tidal marsh next to San Pablo Bay. It is part of the Pacific Flyway for migratory birds and was used extensively by Native Americans until the 1800s, when federal legislation allowed the State of California to fill in wetlands. Senator John P. Jones, of Nevada, purchased  for development by his brother. Chinese laborers, freed from railroad building work, were employed to construct levees to control flooding by Sonoma Creek. The area became a diked wetland area, converted to hay farms and salt ponds, before becoming a United States Navy electronic communications station between 1942 and 1993. The VORTAC radio navigation beacon (Identifier: SGD. Frequency: 112.10 MHz) remains operational. It is a medium-power facility, used by aircraft for low-level enroute navigation.

On March 31, 2011, Skaggs Island became part of the  San Pablo Bay National Wildlife Refuge, created in 1974 to protect migratory birds, wetland habitat and endangered species.

Skaggs Island was named for Marion Barton Skaggs, who financially helped the struggling Sonoma Land Company during the depression of the 1930s.

See also
 Two Rock
 AN/FRD-10, a High-frequency direction finding system at NSGA Skaggs Island during the cold war.

References

Footnotes

Sources
 

Communications and electronic installations of the United States Navy
Installations of the United States Navy in California
Military installations closed in the 1990s
Islands of Sonoma County, California
Islands of Northern California
San Pablo Bay
Wetlands of the San Francisco Bay Area
National Wildlife Refuges in California
Protected areas of Sonoma County, California
Protected areas established in 2011
Islands of the San Francisco Bay Area
Closed installations of the United States Navy
1941 establishments in California
1993 disestablishments in California